Palathinal Joseph Joseph (born 10 June 1941) is an Indian politician from Kerala Congress serving as the Member of the Legislative Assembly from Thodupuzha Assembly Constituency in Kerala.

A former cabinet minister, Joseph entered Kerala politics through Kerala Congress in 1968.

Early life 
P. J. Joseph was born on 10 June 1941 to Palathinal Joseph and Annamma at Purapuzha in Idukki District in central Kerala.

He married Dr. Santha Joseph (died 2023), retired as Additional Director, Kerala Health Department, on 15 September 1971. The couple has four children, three sons and one daughter, named as Er.Apu John Joseph, Dr. Anu Yamuna, Antony Joseph and the late Jomon Joseph. Jomon Joseph, the youngest, suffered from Down's Syndrome, and died due to a massive heart attack in 2020 aged 34.

Political career 
Joseph entered Kerala politics through Kerala Congress in 1968.

P. J. Joseph contested and won his first election from Thodupuzha to the Kerala legislative assembly. He won these elections on ten occasions (1970, 1977, 1980, 1982, 1987, 1996, 2006, 2011, 2016, 2021). He held various ministerial positions within the Government of Kerala:

As Home Minister (1978)
Joseph's first time as a Minister was in 1978 as Home Minister in A. K. Antony's ministry. He served this role for nearly 8 months. He resigned the position for his colleague K.M Mani.

As Revenue minister (1981-1987)
Since 1981 Joseph became Revenue minister in K. Karunakaran's ministry. Joseph was Revenue minister between 1981 and 1982 and 1982–1987.

As Education minister (1996-2001) 
In E. K. Nayanar's ministry between (1996 and 2001) Joseph was Education minister.

PWD minister (2006-2010) 
He was short-term PWD minister in V. S. Achuthanandan's ministry in 2006 and 2010. He resigned twice. The first time he was accused of misbehaviour with a lady co-passenger. He was acquitted by the court. The second time was for leaving Left Democratic Front for united Kerala congress. It was after 23 years, Joseph's party again merged with Kerala Congress (M) and an alliance member of United Democratic Front (UDF).

Kerala Congress (Joseph)
In 1979 he parted ways with Kerala congress leader K. M. Mani to form a Kerala Congress (Joseph) new party. However in 1985 Kerala congress leaders K. M. Mani (from Kerala Congress (M)), P. J. Joseph from Kerala Congress (Joseph), R. Balakrishna Pillai (from Kerala Congress (B)) and their parties merged forming the united Kerala Congress. This party split in 1987. P. J. Joseph continued in United Democratic Front (UDF) till 1989. He contested the Lok Sabha at Muvattupuzha and Idukki in 1989 and 1991, but was unsuccessful. Kerala Congress (Joseph) issue raised in Muvattupuzha Lok Sabha seat made him leave the alliance and join LDF. Since 1991 Joseph's party became part of the Left Democratic Front (LDF) as an alliance.

In 2010, after 23 years, Joseph's party again merged with Kerala Congress (M) and an alliance member of United Democratic Front (UDF).

On 30 April 2010, Joseph resigned from the LDF government and declared his party's merger with K. M. Mani's party. After UDF's win in Kerala Legislative Assembly's election in 2011, Oommen Chandy became Chief Minister of Kerala. Joseph was appointed minister for the 7th time, now with the portfolio of irrigation; he completed his term in 2016.

Chairman Of Kerala Congress
A power struggle erupted in the party between Jose K. Mani faction and P. J. Joseph fraction. The Election Commission intervened and it ruled in favor of Jose K Mani. Later, the faction led by P.J Joseph merged with Kerala Congress.

On April 27 an online meeting was convened by the party leadership in Thodupuzha and P.J Joseph was chosen as party chairman.

Controversies
Joseph resigned from the Kerala Cabinet on 4 September 2006 as he was accused of misbehaviour with a lady co-passenger on a Kingfisher flight. He was acquitted by court on 11 May 2009 due to insufficient evidence.

He instituted the Gandhian Studies Centre and the Gandhi Centre for Sustainable Development.

See also

 Second Oommen Chandy ministry
 V. S. Achuthanandan ministry
 Third E. K. Nayanar ministry
 Third K. Karunakaran ministry
 Second K. Karunakaran ministry
 First A. K. Antony ministry

References

External links

 https://www.mathrubhumi.com/news/kerala/election-commission-freezes-kerala-congress-m-randila-symbol-1.5214284

 https://www.manoramaonline.com/district-news/kottayam/2020/11/12/kottayam-kerala-congress-dispute-about-party-symbol.html
കേരള കോണ്‍ഗ്രസ്-എം എന്ന പേരും രണ്ടില ചിഹ്നവും: സ്റ്റേ 31 വരെ
32582818.ece
leaves-symbol-allotted-jose-k-mani-p-j-joseph-to-file-appeal-1.5018852
congress-jacob-splits-johny-nellore-groups-to-merge-with-p-j-joseph-faction-1.4547638
The Hindu, More time given to complete probe

The Hindu Businessline, Draft policy on organic farming in Kerala to be ready soon
Ashanet, An educative experiment

Living people
Malayali politicians
Loyola College, Chennai alumni
Kerala Congress (M) politicians
People from Idukki district
Kerala MLAs 1970–1977
Kerala MLAs 1987–1991
Kerala MLAs 2016–2021
Kerala MLAs 2011–2016
Education Ministers of Kerala
1941 births
Kerala Congress politicians